In mathematics, the Schwartz–Zippel lemma (also called the DeMillo–Lipton–Schwartz–Zippel lemma) is a tool commonly used in probabilistic polynomial identity testing, i.e. in the problem of determining whether a given multivariate polynomial is the
0-polynomial (or identically equal to 0). It was discovered independently by Jack Schwartz, Richard Zippel, and Richard DeMillo and Richard J. Lipton, although DeMillo and Lipton's version was shown a year prior to Schwartz and Zippel's result. The finite field version of this bound was proved by Øystein Ore in 1922.

Statement and proof of the lemma 

Theorem 1 (Schwartz, Zippel). Let

 

be a non-zero polynomial of total degree  over a field F. Let S be a finite subset of F and let  be selected at random independently and uniformly from S. Then

 

Equivalently, the Lemma states that for any finite subset S of F, if Z(P) is the zero set of P, then 

 

Proof.  The proof is by mathematical induction on n. For , as was mentioned before, P can have at most d roots.  This gives us the base case.
Now, assume that the theorem holds for all polynomials in  variables. We can then consider P to be a polynomial in x1 by writing it as

 

Since  is not identically 0, there is some  such that  is not identically 0. Take the largest such .

By the induction hypothesis, 

If , then  is of degree  (and thus not identically zero) so

 

Applications 
The importance of the Schwartz–Zippel Theorem and Testing Polynomial Identities follows
from algorithms which are obtained to problems that can be reduced to the problem
of polynomial identity testing.

Zero testing 
For example, is

 

To solve this, we can multiply it out and check that all the coefficients are 0.  However, this takes exponential time. In general, a polynomial can be algebraically represented by an arithmetic formula or circuit.

Comparison of two polynomials 
    
 ?

This problem can be solved by reducing it to the problem of polynomial identity testing. It is equivalent to checking if

 

Hence if we can determine that
   
 
   
where

 
   
then we can determine whether the two polynomials are equivalent.

Comparison of polynomials has applications for branching programs (also called binary decision diagrams). A read-once branching program can be represented by a multilinear polynomial which computes (over any field) on {0,1}-inputs the same Boolean function as the branching program, and two branching programs compute the same function if and only if the corresponding polynomials are equal. Thus, identity of Boolean functions computed by read-once branching programs can be reduced to polynomial identity testing.

Comparison of two polynomials (and therefore testing polynomial identities) also has
applications in 2D-compression, where the problem of finding the equality of two
2D-texts A and B is reduced to the problem

Primality testing 
Given , is  a prime number?

A simple randomized algorithm developed by Manindra Agrawal and Somenath Biswas can determine probabilistically
whether  is prime and uses polynomial identity testing to do so.

They propose that all prime numbers n (and only prime numbers) satisfy the following
polynomial identity:

  

This is a consequence of the Frobenius endomorphism.

Let

 

Then  iff n is prime.  The proof can be found in [4].  However, 
since this polynomial has degree , where  may or may not be a prime, 
the Schwartz–Zippel method would not work.   Agrawal and Biswas use a more sophisticated technique, which divides 
 by a random monic polynomial of small degree.

Prime numbers are used in a number of applications such as hash table sizing, pseudorandom number
generators and in key generation for cryptography.  Therefore, finding very large prime numbers
(on the order of (at least) ) becomes very important and efficient primality testing algorithms
are required.

Perfect matching 
Let  be a graph of  vertices where  is even. Does  contain a perfect matching?

Theorem 2 : A Tutte matrix determinant is not a -polynomial if and only if there exists a perfect matching.

Create a Tutte matrix  in the following way:

 

where

 

The Tutte matrix determinant (in the variables xij) is then defined as the determinant of this skew-symmetric matrix which coincides with the square of the pfaffian of the matrix A and is non-zero (as polynomial) if and only if a perfect matching exists.
One can then use polynomial identity testing to find whether  contains a perfect matching. There exists a deterministic black-box algorithm for graphs with polynomially bounded permanents (Grigoriev & Karpinski 1987).

In the special case of a balanced bipartite graph on  vertices this matrix takes the form of a block matrix 
 
if the first m rows (resp. columns) are indexed with the first subset of the bipartition and the last m rows with the complementary subset. In this case the pfaffian coincides with the usual determinant of the m × m matrix X (up to sign).  Here X is the Edmonds matrix.

Determinant of a matrix with polynomial entries 
Let

 

be the determinant of the polynomial matrix.

Currently, there is no known sub-exponential time algorithm that can solve this problem deterministically. However, there are randomized polynomial algorithms whose analysis requires a bound on the probability that a non-zero polynomial will have roots at randomly selected test points.

Notes

References

 
 

 Moshkovitz, Dana (2010). An Alternative Proof of The Schwartz-Zippel Lemma.

External links
 The Curious History of the Schwartz–Zippel Lemma, by Richard J. Lipton

Theorems about polynomials
Computer algebra
Lemmas in algebra
Mathematical theorems in theoretical computer science